Boyacı Camii, also called Boyacıoğlu Camii or Kadı Kemalettin Camii is a Mosque in Gaziantep, Turkey.

It is located in the Şahinbey district of the city at the intersection of Kutlar Street and Hamdi Kutlar Avenue. Construction began in 1211 under the orders of Kadı Kemalettin Bey and it was finished in 1357.

References 

Mosques in Gaziantep
14th-century mosques
Mosques completed in 1357